Fabrício Mafuta is an Angolan footballer who plays as a defender for F.C. Bravos do Maquis. During the 2016 season he has played 2 FIFA matches and 1 Non-FIFA match, scoring no goals or substitutions.

In 2018–19, he signed in for Kabuscorp Sport Clube of Angola.

In 2019-20, he signed in for FC Bravos do Maquis in the Angolan league, the Girabola.

References

External links 
 

1988 births
Living people
Association football defenders
Angolan footballers
Angola international footballers
2013 Africa Cup of Nations players
F.C. Bravos do Maquis players
G.D. Interclube players
Kabuscorp S.C.P. players
Girabola players
2011 African Nations Championship players
Angola A' international footballers
2016 African Nations Championship players